William Wilson (born 1921) was Scottish professional footballer who played as a goalkeeper.

Wilson was born in Dumfries and played in the local amateur scene for Crichton Royal before joining hometown club Queen of the South. At Queens he was unable to secure a regular game ahead of Roy Henderson and was transferred to Clyde, for whom he broke a finger in the 1955 Scottish Cup semi-final against Dave Halliday's Aberdeen and thus missed the final win against Celtic. In charge of the semi-final was referee Bob Davidson, father of another Queen of the South goalkeeper Alan Davidson.

References

1921 births
Possibly living people
Scottish footballers
Footballers from Dumfries
Queen of the South F.C. players
Clyde F.C. players
Association football goalkeepers
Scottish Football League players
People educated at Dumfries High School